Pi Arietis, Latinized from π Arietis, is the Bayer designation for a multiple star system in the northern constellation of Aries. Based upon parallax measurements made during the Hipparcos mission, this system is approximately  distant from Earth and has an apparent visual magnitude of 5.21. This is bright enough to be faintly seen with the naked eye.

The primary member of this system is a massive, B-type main sequence star with a stellar classification of B6 V. It is a close spectroscopic binary with an orbital period of 3.854 days, an eccentricity of 0.04, and a combined visual magnitude of 5.30. At an angular separation of 3.28 arcseconds is a magnitude 8.46 A-type main sequence star with a classification of A0 Vp. Finally, a fourth member of the system is a magnitude 11.0 F-type main sequence star with a classification of F8V at an angular separation of 25.2 arcseconds from the primary.

Name

This star, along with  δ Ari, ε Ari, ζ Ari, and ρ3 Ari, were Al Bīrūnī's Al Buṭain (ألبطين), the dual of Al Baṭn, the Belly. According to the catalogue of stars in the Technical Memorandum 33-507 - A Reduced Star Catalog Containing 537 Named Stars, Al Buṭain were the title for five stars : δ Ari as Botein, π Ari as Al Buṭain I, ρ3 Ari as Al Buṭain II, ε Ari as Al Buṭain III dan ζ Ari as Al Buṭain IV.

References

External links
Aladin previewer
Aladin sky atlas
 HR 836

017543
013165
Arietis, Pi
Arietis, 42
Aries (constellation)
B-type main-sequence stars
A-type main-sequence stars
F-type main-sequence stars
Spectroscopic binaries
4
0836
Durchmusterung objects